Karungali is a suburb north of Chennai, a metropolitan city in Tamil Nadu, India.

Administration
It is a revenue village and a part of Thangalperumbulam village panchayat in Minjur block. It is administered by Ponneri taluk of Tiruvallur district.

Location
Karungali is located in between Ennore, Pazhaverkadu and Minjur in North of Chennai. The arterial road in Karungali is Port access road (Ennore - Pazhaverkadu road).

References

Neighbourhoods in Chennai